Sylvester Emmons (28 February 1808 – 15 November 1881) was an American attorney born in New Jersey.

Life in Nauvoo, Illinois

Emmons moved to Illinois in 1840, and in 1843 was elected to the Nauvoo City Council despite being a non-Mormon.

In 1844, Emmons became editor of the Nauvoo Expositor, which published statements critical of Smith and other LDS church leaders. After Smith ordered the destruction of the press, Smith was arrested and killed by a mob while awaiting trial.

Later life
Emmons moved Beardstown, Illinois, and became the editor of the town's Gazette. He died in November 1881.

References

Nauvoo, Illinois city council members
History of the Church of Jesus Christ of Latter-day Saints
1808 births
1881 deaths
19th-century American politicians
People from Beardstown, Illinois